On 29 July 2022, an Mil Mi-8 helicopter belonging to the Border Police of Georgia crashed during a rescue mission in a mountainous valley near Gudauri, a Greater Caucasus mountain resort in Georgia's northeast. All eight people on board died.

Accident 
On 29 July 2022, a tandem paraglider suffered an accident near Gudauri, with the two occupants falling into a deep rocky gorge. The Border Police of Georgia dispatched a Soviet-designed Mi-8 helicopter—piloted by the veteran officer Colonel Zaza Loria—on a rescue mission. The helicopter lost control while hovering over the gorge and crashed, killing all eight people on board, including four crew members, two emergency physicians, and two rescuers. Subsequently, one of the people paragliding, a foreign tourist, was also found dead; the other, injured, was retrieved by ambulance to safety. According to a police report, a tail rotor failure might have caused the crash.

Reactions 
After the crash, the next day was declared a national day of mourning in Georgia. President of Georgia Salome Zourabichvili posthumously awarded the crew, rescuers and first responders with the Medal for Civic Dedication. The accident also reignited a broader discussion about the safety of paragliding business, which remained largely unregulated at the time of the disaster, and the ability of the Interior Ministry to handle similar incidents with the available equipment and transports.

References 

Gudauri
Gudauri
Aviation accidents and incidents in Georgia (country)
Accidents and incidents involving the Mil Mi-8
Mtskheta-Mtianeti
2022 disasters in Georgia (country)